Senator Clarkson may refer to:

Alison H. Clarkson (born 1955), Vermont State Senate
Matthew Clarkson (1758–1825), New York State Senate